Sephira also known as Sephira - The Irish Rock Violinists are an Irish band consisting of sisters Joyce and Ruth O'Leary, who both play the violin and provide vocals. They released their debut album Believe in 2006. Its style is classical crossover with traditional Irish influences.

Background 
The O'Leary sisters are from Carrickmacross, County Monaghan, Ireland.  They started studying violin in early childhood: Joyce at two and a half and Ruth at six.  Joyce performed in the National Concert Hall, Dublin aged just three, playing a Bach minuet. She was named Ireland's Most Promising Violinist when she was nine.

Ruth studied music performance at London's Guildhall School of Music to study for a BA in Music Performance. She continued her studies in Dublin, where she received a first class honours B.A. with a performance of Mendelssohn's Violin Concerto at the National Concert Hall, Dublin. During her years of study Ruth performed with acts such as Rodrigo y Gabriela and featured on their  Live in Manchester and Dublin album.

History 
Specializing in theater shows, corporate events and private events, Sephira have performed private events for Prince Albert of Monaco, the late Larry Hagman, Priscilla Presley, Linda Gray and the women of Congress in Washington, D.C. They have as well performed for other dignitaries including a US President, US Vice President, US Secretary of Homeland Security, and the US National Coast Guard Foundation.

In April 2012, Sephira released their EP "Eternity" dedicated to their late friend and mentor, Larry Hagman. It features unique material showcasing their new sound and brand new show. It also includes their track called Miracle dedicated to all fallen soldiers and their families.

Discography 
Believe (2006) was the band's debut album.  It features eleven original compositions and a version of 'If' by David Gates. The album was recorded in The Cauldron Studios, Dublin, and was produced by producer and instrumentalist Bill Shanley. Other musicians featured on the album include Ruby Ashley, William Butt, Noel Eccles, Karen Hamill and former band member Colm Henry.
"Sephira" (2008) released for the US market – a mix of "Believe" favourites and 2008 EP "Love of my Life".
"Starlight" (2011) was Sephira's first holiday album featuring Christmas songs including "O Holy Night" and a unique version of "Silent Night" with one verse in Gaelic.
"Eternity" (2012) was dedicated to their late friend and mentor, Larry Hagman. Tracks include the Saint-Saens Danse Macabre, Palladio by Karl Jenkins and To Love You More.

References

External links 
 Sephira Official Site
 Sephira IMDB page
 Sephira on Reverbnation
 Sephira perform for the Women of Congress – The Washingtonian
 Sephira perform at Diner en Blanc 2013
 Sephira Interview with Irish America Magazine
 IMRO article about Sephira's Eternity EP release
 Sephira interview with Celtic Life Magazine
 Sephira TV Interview on King5 TV, Seattle

Carrickmacross
Musical groups from County Monaghan